David Houston demonstrated Sex Allocation in lesser black-backed gulls in a practical study with Pat Monaghan in 1999.

His research interests include Ecology of Vultures, Egg Production and Digestive Efficiency.

References

Living people
British zoologists
Year of birth missing (living people)